

Films

References

LGBT
1995 in LGBT history
1995